Puttingal Temple is a Hindu temple in the coastal town of Paravur, India. The temple was founded after the presence of the goddess was experienced on an ant hill with Puttu being the Malayalam word for ant Hill.

The main festival is celebrated on the day of Bharani star in Meenam. Fireworks and other events associated with the festival take place along with other cultural events with various poojas performed.

2016 fire 

On 10 April 2016, 114 people were killed due to a fireworks mishap at this temple, while over 350 other people were injured. A cracker fell on a shed where the fireworks were stored, setting off an explosion. Permission was not given to the temple by the authorities for the fireworks display and a case was registered.

See also
 List of Hindu temples in Kerala

References

External links

 Official Website

Hindu temples in Kollam district
Tourist attractions in Kollam district
Devi temples in Kerala